The 2000 Texas Tech Red Raiders football team represented Texas Tech University as a member of the Big 12 Conference during the 2000 NCAA Division I-A football season. In their first season under head coach Mike Leach, the Red Raiders compiled a 7–6 record (3–5 against Big 12 opponents), finished in fourth place in Southern Division of the Big 12, and outscored opponents by a combined total of 330 to 278. The team played its home games at Jones SBC Stadium in Lubbock, Texas.

Of the team's staff and players, 23 went on to coach either in the NFL or in college football, including eight head coaches of FBS football teams and eight more who were FBS coordinators.  Defensive coordinator Greg McMackin, running backs coach Art Briles, wide receivers coach Sonny Dykes, inside receivers coach Dana Holgorsen, linebackers coach Ruffin McNeill, special teams coordinator Manny Matsakis, and starting quarterback Kliff Kingsbury all went on to become FBS head coaches, with Kingsbury eventually becoming an NFL head coach.

Schedule

Personnel

Game summaries

New Mexico

at Texas A&M

Nebraska

at Oklahoma

vs. East Carolina (Galleryfurniture.com Bowl)

Team players drafted into the NFL

References

Texas Tech
Texas Tech Red Raiders football seasons
Texas Tech Red Raiders football